Autozodiaco  was an Italian car manufacturer located in Bologna, focusing mainly on dune buggies based on the VW Beetle. The company existed between 1968 and 1981.

Car models (Dune buggy)
Damaca 1971-1981
Deserter 1968-1981 based on VW
Deserter
Deserter 1.2
Deserter Neve
Deserter Jumper
Deserter Jumper 1.2
Deserter Jumper 1600
Kirby (Based on a Skoda engine) 1972-?
Squalo 1971-?

Converter kits for VW Beetle
California

Motorbikes

In the 1970s they produced the offroad motorbike Moto Zodiaco Tuareg. With large balloon tyres it was intended as a dune buggy.

The Moto Zodiaco was powered by a stroke single cylinder 227cc motor with 20bhp, (normally found in snowmobiles) and a pulley transmission (normally found in tractors). The top speed was around 100 km/h.

The bike had a yank cord start but an electric starter was optional. It was available in colors: sunshine yellow, alpine white and red Verona.

All Cars
In 1978 Autozodiaco sold the rights to construct a three-wheel micro car, renamed the All Cars Charly. It was similar in appearance to the Bond Bug and was powered by a 49cc moped engine.

See also 

List of Italian companies
List of motorcycle manufacturers

References

Defunct motor vehicle manufacturers of Italy
Vehicle manufacturing companies established in 1961